Smith River National Recreation Area is a protected area located in northwestern California, United States. The national recreation area is in Six Rivers National Forest and is managed by the U.S. Forest Service, an agency of the U.S. Department of Agriculture. Created by Congress in 1990, Smith River National Recreation Area meets the northern border of Redwood National and State Parks.

The Klamath Mountains and the Smith River, one of the longest National Wild and Scenic Rivers in the U.S., offer a variety of recreational opportunities. The National Recreation Area has five campgrounds located near major streams and along the Smith River. It is considered one of the best fishing regions in the country, and rafting and canoeing are popular activities. Most hiking trails are accessible year-round, but all activities may be greatly affected by periodic heavy rainfall that swells creeks and rivers.

Climate
Summers may be foggy as moisture laden clouds rise up the Coast Range mountains from the Pacific Ocean.

Ecology
Trophy sized steelhead, chinook salmon and other game fish species have led to this area being considered one of the best fishing regions in the United States. 
To prevent the spread of a root disease caused by the pathogen Phytophthora lateralis, forest roads and campgrounds may be closed during the rainy season when there is the most opportunities for contaminated soil to be spread around. The spores that live in water and wet soil can be introduced by vehicles, animals and people traveling from infected areas.

Transportation
The area is bisected by U.S. Route 199 which is designated the Smith River Scenic Byway. Passing through the community of Hiouchi, Gasquet and Patrick Creek Lodge on the western side of the summit, the National Forest Scenic Byway is part of the California Freeway and Expressway System and is eligible for the State Scenic Highway System. The highway is the northern portion of the Redwood Highway.

See also

References

External links
 
 
 
 Smith River, California - Nation Wild and Scenic River System 

Protected areas of Del Norte County, California
National Recreation Areas of the United States
Protected areas of California
Six Rivers National Forest